Sir Robert James MacGillivray Neill (born 24 June 1952) is a British barrister and Conservative Party politician. He has served as the Member of Parliament (MP) for Bromley and Chislehurst since a by-election on 29 June 2006, following the death of the previous incumbent Eric Forth. He served as a Parliamentary Under Secretary of State at the Department of Communities and Local Government from 14 May 2010 to 4 September 2012. He is the current Chair of Parliament's Justice Select Committee.

Biography
Neill was born in Ilford to John Macgillivray Neill and Elsie May Neill. Neill attended Abbs Cross Technical High School in Hornchurch. He took his law degree at the London School of Economics and in criminal law after graduating. He was later a councillor in the London Borough of Havering, served as Greater London Council member for Romford 1985–86. He previously stood for the Dagenham parliamentary constituency in 1983, at the age of 30, coming within 2,997 votes of winning the historically Labour seat from Bryan Gould MP. He refought the seat in 1987, coming even closer to winning by slightly cutting the Labour majority to 2,469, but Gould defeated him again. He also stood for election in the London Borough of Tower Hamlets in 1994 and 1998.

Neill was first elected to the London Assembly in the 2000 assembly election, and served as the Conservative member for Bexley and Bromley from 2000 until 2008. He served as Leader of the Conservative Group on the Assembly from 2000 to 2002 and again from 2004.

Between January 2013 and March 2015 he also served as a substitute member on the Parliamentary Assembly of the Council of Europe. A pro-European, he supported former Conservative Chancellor Kenneth Clarke in both of his bids for the leadership of the Conservative Party.

Neill is a Freemason. Since April 2017, Neill has been a Bencher at the Middle Temple.

Neill was married from 2009 until 2015 to former Southend Conservative Councillor and former Mayor, Daphne White. In July 2018 he married Ann-Louise Whittaker, a music teacher and former opera singer and performer.

Bromley and Chislehurst by-election

Following the death of Eric Forth in May 2006, on 3 June 2006 he was adopted as the Conservative candidate for the Bromley and Chislehurst by-election which took place on 29 June 2006. His selection by the local Conservative Association raised eyebrows, as new leader David Cameron had pressed for an "A-List" candidate, to help present Cameron's vision of the new Conservative Party. The Parliamentary constituency forms a part of Neill's London Assembly constituency. He stated at his selection that he would not resign his London Assembly seat as the resultant by-election, which would see around 400,000 voters go to the polls, would be unduly expensive.

A few questions were raised about Neill's position as a non-executive director of the North East London Strategic Health Authority, which fell foul of the House of Commons Disqualification Act of 1975. His response was that, because the body was due to be abolished before he would have had the chance to take his seat in Westminster, any such arguments were immaterial.

Neill won the by-election by just 633 votes, compared to the 13,342 majority achieved by his predecessor at the 2005 general election. Factors contributing to this were assumed by commentators to include a substantial drop in the turnout (down from 64.8 to 40.18%), with the drop disproportionally hitting the Conservative vote; the presence of a high-profile UKIP candidate, Nigel Farage – Labour ended up coming fourth, after UKIP; and a campaign by the Liberal Democrats that heavily focused on Neill personally. In his acceptance speech Neill criticised "a minority of candidates" (which was assumed to be specifically criticising the Liberal Democrat candidate) for their ad hominem attacks on him. These included statements regarding Neill's occupations outside his future parliamentary role (including the nickname "Three Jobs Bob") and the fact that, at that time, he did not live in the constituency, although he has since purchased a house there.

In parliament 
In 2008 Neill was made Shadow Local Government Minister and Deputy Chairman of the Conservative Party and was assigned the shadow planning brief from January 2009. He was elected as MP for a second term in the May 2010 election and worked as Parliamentary Under Secretary of State at the Department of Communities and Local Government until September 2012, when he was named Vice Chairman of the Conservative party for Local Government.

Neill's approach to statistics and parliamentary privilege has been questioned by Dr Ben Goldacre. Neill claimed local government could save 20% from all services, based on a management consultant's estimate of how much could be saved from mobile phone bills.

As of 2008, Neill claims an allowance for a second home outside London, despite his constituency home being only 12 miles from Westminster. A spokesman said that his claims were "in accordance with the rules".

Neill was re-elected for a third term in May 2015, shortly after which he was elected as Chairman of Parliament's Justice Select Committee. Following the General Election on 8 June 2017, he was returned to this role.

Neill was strongly opposed to Brexit prior to the 2016 referendum. On 7 February 2017, along with six other Conservative Members of Parliament, he defied the Party whip and voted in favour of New Clause 110 of the European Union (Withdrawal) Bill. In December 2017, in the same bill, he voted along with fellow Conservative Dominic Grieve and nine other Tory MPs against the government, and in favour of guaranteeing Parliament a "meaningful vote" on any deal Theresa May agrees with Brussels over Brexit.

Neill maintains Legal aid should be more widely available. Neill said in 2018 that cuts to legal aid had gone too far, stating: "The evidence is pretty compelling that changes are needed … We cannot expect people who often have multiple problems in their lives necessarily to be able to resolve such things on their own."

Neill was knighted in the 2020 New Year Honours for political service.

In September 2020 Neill asked Northern Ireland Secretary Brandon Lewis for an assurance that the published Internal Market Bill would not breach international law and Lewis admitted that it would do so "in a very specific and limited way."

In May 2022, following the publication of the Sue Gray report, Neill submitted a letter of no confidence in Prime Minister Johnson calling for his resignation.

References

External links
Bob Neill Official site

Profile at Westminster Parliamentary Record
Profile  at BBC News Democracy Live
Electoral history and profile at The Guardian
Biography from the London Assembly
Biography from Department of Communities and Local Government

1952 births
Alumni of the London School of Economics
Conservative Members of the London Assembly
Conservative Party (UK) MPs for English constituencies
Councillors in the London Borough of Havering
Freemasons of the United Grand Lodge of England
Living people
Members of the Greater London Council
People from Ilford
People from Bromley
UK MPs 2005–2010
UK MPs 2010–2015
UK MPs 2015–2017
UK MPs 2017–2019
UK MPs 2019–present
Knights Bachelor
Politicians awarded knighthoods